= Baltimore Declaration =

The Baltimore Declaration is a statement written by six Episcopal priests in the Diocese of Maryland in 1991 regarding affirmation of Christian orthodoxy. It is sometimes used as a manifesto by Episcopal factions which wish to reaffirm orthodox Christian principles within the Episcopal Church in the United States of America.

== Signers ==
- The Rev. Ronald S. Fisher
- The Rev. Alvin F. Kimel Jr.
- The Rev. R. Gary Matthewes-Green
- The Rev. William N. McKeachie
- The Rev. Frederick J. Ramsay
- The Rev. Philip Burwell Roulette
